Landgrave Philip III of Hesse-Butzbach (born 26 December 1581 in Darmstadt; died: 28 April 1643) was Landgrave of Hesse-Butzbach from 1609 to 1643.

Life 
His parents were George I "the Pious" of Hesse-Darmstadt (1547–1596) and Magdalene of Lippe (1552–1587).  Philip's first wife was Anna Margaretha of Diepholz; she died childless in 1629 and was buried in the town church at Butzbach.  He married his second wife, Christina Sophia of East Frisia (daughter of Enno III, born: 1609 in Aurich, died 1658 in Frankfurt), in 1632 in Aurich.

When his father died in 1596, the country was divided into three parts.  Hesse-Darmstadt, like many royal courts, practised primogeniture, meaning that the oldest son inherited the country and his younger brothers were compensated with money, or, if no money was available, a much smaller, non-sovereign, territory and less money.  The younger sons were allowed to use the title of "Landgrave", but sovereignty remained with the eldest son.  In this case, eldest son, Louis V "the faithful" inherited the bulk of the country.  Frederick received Homburg and founded the Hesse-Homburg line.  Philip received Butzbach.

His Landgraviate of Butzback initially consisted only of the town of Butzbach and som nearby villages. A quarter of Solms-Braunfels was added during the Thirty Years' War, when the Count of Solms-Braunfels had fallen into disfavour with the Emperor. In 1639, the town of Itter in Waldeck was added, with the castle at Vöhl and the villages that belonged to the castle.

The new residence Butzbach flourished in the middle of the Thirty Years' War.  Landgrave Philip was a learned and well-traveled man; he spoke eight languages, was a mathematician and collected a valuable library.  For astronomical studies, he built an observatory in his Landgraviate Castle in Butzbach and had some astronomical instruments made.  In 1618, he appointed Daniel Mögling (alias Theophilus Schweighart), who was a Rosicrucian and medical doctor and a member of a family of professors from Tübingen, as a court mathematician and court astronomer.  Mogling, who also translated Philip Sidney's Arcadia brought him into contact with Wilhelm Schickard (1592–1635), who had invented a calculating machine in 1623.  Philip III also corresponded with the astronomers Kepler and Galileo.  He had met the 17 years older Galileo during his two trips to Italy in 1602 and 1607.  Kepler visited Butzabch twice, in July 1621 and in October 1627.  Philip III and Kepler observed the size of sunspots together and in 1624, Philip printed Kepler's .  Kepler's daughter Susan also visited the court at Butzbach several times.

Philip expanded his castle and surrounded it with a pleasure garden and a tree garden.  Neither garden has survived.  The largest attraction in the garden was the "planet fountain".  Drawings of this fountain, a painting and a description have survived and a model was constructed recently.

Philip III died in 1643 during a sweating treatment at Bad Ems, which his physician Johann Schröder had prescribed a year earlier.  During his treatment, some alcohol caught fire, due to carelessness of the barber.  Philip III suffered severe burns and died from his wounds shortly afterwards.

Since both of his marriages had been childless, the Landgraviate of Butzbach fell back to Hesse-Darmstadt after just one generation.  His second wife, Christina Sophia, remained on the castle in Butzbach until her death.

References 

 
 Siegfried Rösch: Landgraf Philipp v. Hessen-Butzbach und sein Gelehrtenkreis, Genealogical yearbook, vol. 8, Degener, Neustadt an der Aisch, 1968.
 Siegfried Rösch: Landgraf Philipp III. von Hessen-Butzbach und Johannes Kepler, Wetterauer Geschichtsblatt, vol. 24, Friedberg, Hesse, 1975.

External links 

Landgraves of Hesse-Darmstadt
House of Hesse
1581 births
1643 deaths
17th-century German people